Star Wars: Episode IV - A New Hope is a 1977 science fiction film by George Lucas and the first film in the Star Wars franchise to be released and the fourth chapter chronologically in the nine-part Skywalker Saga. It was originally titled just Star Wars.
 
A New Hope may also refer to:

Star Wars
 Star Wars Episode IV: A New Hope (novel) or Star Wars: From the Adventures of Luke Skywalker
 Star Wars Episode IV: A New Hope (soundtrack)

Music
A New Hope (Amboog-a-Lard album) (1993)
A New Hope (Minipop album) and title track (2007)
A New Hope (Vanna album) (2009)
"A New Hope", a 1997 song by Blink-182 from Dude Ranch
"A New Hope", a 2000 song by Five Iron Frenzy from All the Hype That Money Can Buy

Other uses
"A New Hope" (That '70s Show episode)

See also
New Hope (disambiguation)
 "The New Hope", the subtitle of the 1981  radio adaptation of Star Wars